Neoparalaelaps is a genus of mites in the family Laelapidae.

Species
 Neoparalaelaps bispinosus Fonseca, 1935

References

Laelapidae